Seyed Mohsen Pourmohseni Shakib (born 1988) is an Iranian film director and screenwriter who began his art career at age 17 by becoming a member of the Iranian Youth Cinema Society. He achieved the Youth of the Year Award in Guilan province in the Culture & Art category which was awarded by the Iranian Ministry of Sport and Youth in 2013. His focus as a filmmaker has been elevating the voices of marginalized people through his art. His fifth animated short film The Boot was the first Iranian-produced short film that received a nomination for the best animation at the 49th Student Academy Awards in 2022. The animation story was about a bird struggling to find food for its hungry chickens in a city ravaged by war and famine where there is nothing but wreckage and corpses. Furthermore, He won the 6th WIA Diversity Award for his short animation It's A Gray, Gray world in 2022. The award was created by Women in Animation to recognize and celebrate projects and people that have made a substantial impact in broadening the diversity of voices in the animation industry- whether it be through their own creativity, by fostering the creativity of others, or by driving diversity initiatives that enrich animation industry and communities.

Filmography

As director:
 2010 - White Paper
 2012 - Game Over
 2016 - Oracle
 2018 - Ballsy: Story of A Revolution
 2021 - The Boot
 2022 - It's A Gray, Gray World!

See also
Cinema of Iran

References

External links 
 
 
 Seyed MohsenPourmohseni Shakib interview about The Boot at iFilm (TV channel) (2022)
 Seyed MohsenPourmohseni Shakib interview about Oracle at iFilm (TV channel) (2021)

1988 births
Living people
Iranian film directors
Iranian animated film directors
Iranian screenwriters
People from Rasht